Live Acoustic (Nettwerk) is an EP by Sarah McLachlan.  It was released on 31 May 2004 in Canada only. Four of the tracks were recorded live at a "Live from the Lounge" event with Ryan Seacrest for radio station  Star 98.7 on 7 October 2003.  These tracks were produced by Skip Kelly and remastered by Dave Kutch.  The recording of "Adia" was done at the debut of iTunes for the PC on 21 October 2003. The EP was previously only available on iTunes. The tracks "Angel", "Building a Mystery", and "Adia" are from her previous album Surfacing (1997). "Fallen" and "Answer" are from Afterglow (2003).

Track listing
 "Fallen" - 3:46 (McLachlan)
 "Adia" - 4:01 (McLachlan / Marchand)
 "Angel" - 5:13 (McLachlan)
 "Building a Mystery" - 4:01 (McLachlan / Marchand)
 "Answer" - 3:43 (McLachlan)

Charts

References

2004 EPs
Live EPs
Sarah McLachlan live albums
2004 live albums
Sarah McLachlan EPs